Armenian chant (sharakan) is the melismatic monophonic chant used in the liturgy of the Armenian Apostolic Church and the Armenian Catholic Church.

Armenian chant, like Byzantine chant, consists mainly of hymns. The chants are grouped in a system of eight modes called oktoechos. The oldest hymns were in prose, but later versified hymns, such as those by Nerses Shnorhali, became more prominent. The official book of hymns, the sharakan, contains 1,166 hymns (Šaraknoc').

The earliest surviving manuscripts with music notation date from the 14th century, and use a system of neumes known as Armenian neumes or khaz, which has been in use since the 8th century. In the 19th century a new system of notation, still in use, was introduced by theorist Hamparsum Limonciyan.

Armenian chant is now sung to a precise rhythm, including specific rhythmic patterns, which are atypical of plainsong. This is considered by some scholars (such as P. Aubry) to be a result of Turkish influence, although others (such as R. P. Decevrens) consider it to be of great antiquity and use it as evidence in favor of a more rhythmic interpretation of Gregorian chant.

The chants used by communities in the Armenian Diaspora are usually harmonized and differ from the original forms. The source of the most traditional music is the liturgies at Echmiadzin, the religious center of Armenia.

See also
 Armenian Rite
 Music of Armenia
 Ktsord
 Tagh

References

External links
Armenian Liturgical Chant Ensemble Akn

19th-century music genres
Armenian music
Armenian Apostolic Church
Christian chants